This is a list of Great American Beer Festival Medal Winning Breweries. The Great American Beer Festival includes a Judge panel which judges a significant number of Beers, 3,930 in 2012. This Judge panel award Gold, Silver, and Bronze to the top beers in each category according to a GABF style guidelines. 
These medals are quite coveted as symbols of brewing excellence around the world

Hubidahu

GABF Medal winning breweries

Numeric
 5 Rabbit Cerveceria
 10 Barrel Brewing Company
 21st Amendment Brewery
 23rd Street Brewery
 75th Street Brewery Lawerence
 5280 Roadhouse & Brewery CLOSED

A
 Aardwolf Brewing Company
 AC Golden Brewing Company
 Acadian Brewing Company
 Aiken Brewing Company
 Alameda Brewing Company CLOSED
 Alcatraz Brewing Company
 The Alchemist
 Allagash Brewing Company
 Alltech's Lexington Brewing Company
 Alaskan Brewing Company
 AleSmith Brewing Company
 Alpine Beer Company
 Altitude Chophouse and Brewery
 Ambier Brewing Company
 American Brewing Company
 Americas Brewing Company/Walter Paytons Roundhouse
 Amherst Brewing Company
 Amicas
 Anchor Brewing Company
 Anderson Valley Brewing Company
 Angelic Brewing Company
 Anheuser-Busch
 Appleton Brewing Company/ Alder Brau
 Arcadia Brewing Company
 Arizona Roadhouse and Brewery
 Aspen Brewing Company
 Atlanta Brewing Company
 Atwater Block Brewing Company
 Auburn Alehouse
 Augsburger Brewing Company
 August Schell Brewing Company
 Augusta Brewing Company
 Austin Beerworks
 Avery Brewing Company

B
 Back Bay Brewing Company
 Back Forty Beer Company
 Back Street Brewery Vista
 Backcountry Brewery
 Badger Hill Brewing
 Ballast Point Brewing Company
 Baltimore Brewing Company CLOSED
 Bardo Rodeo CLOSED
 Barley Brothers Brewery and Grill
 Barley Brown's Brew Pub
 Barley Island Brewing Company
 Barley's Casino & Brewing Company
 Barrio Brewing Company
 Barton Beers Ltd
 Basil Ts Brew Pub & Italian Grill
 Bastone Brewery
 Bavarian Brewing Company Ltd
 Beachwood BBQ & Brewing
 Bear Republic Brewing Company
 Bear Republic Brewing Company Factory Five
 Bear Republic Brewing Company Healdsburg
 Beartooth Brewing Company
 Beaver St. Brewery
 The Beer Company
 The Bellows Brew Crew
 Bell's Brewery
 Bend Brewing Company
 Bent River Brewing Company
 Berghoff-Huber Brewing Company
 Bethlehem Brew Works
 Bier Brewery
 Big Bear Brewing Company
 Big Buck Brewery Brewery and Steakhouse Auburn Hills
 Big Dog's Brewing Company
 Big Horn Brewing Company
 Big House Brewing Company
 Big River Grille and Brewing TN
 Big River Grille and Brewing (Disney Boardwalk, FL)
 Big Rock Chop House & Brewery
 Big Time Brewing Company
 Bills Tavern and Brewhouse
 Bison Brewing Company
 Bitter End Bistro & Brewery  CLOSED
 BJ's Grill & Brewery
 BJ's Restaurant & Brewery Reno & Chandler
 BJ's Restaurant & Brewery Roseville & Portland
 BJ's Restaurant & Brewery Portland
 BJ's Restaurant & Brewery - Boulder
 BJ's Restaurant & Brewery - Chandler
 Black Diamond Brewing Company CLOSED
 Black Forest Brew Haus LLC
 Black Market Brewing Company
 Black Mountain Brewing Company
 Black Tooth Brewing Company
 Blackstone Brewing Company
 Blind Pig Brewing Company CLOSED
 Blind Tiger Brewery & Restaurant
 Blitz-Weinhard Brewing
 Blue Corn Café & Brewery
 Blue Moon Brewing Company
 Blue Mountain Barrel House
 Blue Mountain Brewery
 Blue Point Brewing Company
 Bluegrass Brewing Company
 Bob's House of Brews
 Bohannon Brewing Company
 Bohemian Brewery Company
 Bond Brothers Beer Company
 Boscos Brewing Company
 Bosocos Little Rock Brewing Company
 Boston Beer Company
 Boston Beer Company - Samuel Adams Cincinnati Brewery
 Boston Beer Works
 Bottoms Up Brewing Company
 Boulder Beer Company
 Boulder Brewing Company
 Boulevard Brewing Company
 Boundary Bay Brewing Company
 Bradley's Restaurant
 Brasserie Monx Ltd
 Brasserie Saint James
 Breakers Restaurant & Brewpub CLOSED
 Breakside Brewery
 Breakwater Brewing Company 
 Breckenridge Brewery
 The Brew Kettle Production Works
 Brew Moon Enterprises Inc.
 Brew Moon Restaurant & Microbrewery
 Brew Moon South Shore Mall Ventures
 Brewers Alley
 Brewer's Alley Restaurant and Brewery
 Brewery Ommegang
 Brewski Brewing Company
 BrewWorks Restaurant
 Brewzzi
 Brickstone Brewery
 BridgePort Brewing Company CLOSED
 Brimstone Brewing Company
 Bristol Brewing Company
 Broad Ripple Brewing Company
 Broadway Brewing
 Brooklyn Brewery
 The Bruery
 Brugge Brasserie
 Buckbean Brewing Company CLOSED
 The Buckhead Brewery & Grill
 Bull & Bush Brewery
 Bulldog Brewing Company
 Bullfrog Brewery
 Burke-Gilman Brewing Company
 Burnside Brewing Company
 Butte Creek Brewing Company
 Butterfield Brewing Company
 Buzzards Bay Brewing

C
 Calhoun's Restaurant & Brewing Company of Harrisonburg, VA Closed
 Calhoun's Tennessee Microbrewery
 Cambridge Brewing Company
 The Cambridge House Brewpub
 Capital Brewery Company
 Capitol City Brewing Company Arlington
 Capitol City Brewing Company Capitol Hill
 Captain Lawrence Brewing Company
 Captains City Brewery
 Carolina Brewery
 Carter's Brewing
 Carver Brewing Company
 Cascade Brewery Company LLC
 Cascade Lakes Brewing Company LLC
 Casco Bay Brewing Company
 Castle Springs Brewing Company
 Catamount Brewing Company
 CB & Potts Reataurant & Brewery Denver tec
 CB & Potts Reataurant & Brewery Flaitrons/Westminster
 CB & Potts Reataurant & Brewery - Fort Collins
 CB & Potts Reataurant & Brewery Highlands Ranch
 Celis Brewery Inc.
 Central Waters Brewing Company
 Cervecerias La Cruda
 CH Evans Brewing Company at the Albany Pump Station
 Chama River Brewing Company
 Champion Brewing Company
 Charleville Vineyard & Microbrewery
 Charlie and Jake's Brewery
 Chelsea Brewing Company
 Cherryland Brewing Company
 Chesapeake Bay Brewing Company CLOSED
 Chicago Pizza
 Chicago Brewing Company
 Choc Beer Company
 Chophouse and Brewery Cleveland
 Chuckanut Brewery
 The Church Brew Works
 Cigar City Brewing
 Cisco Brewers
 City Brewing Company
 CJ's Brewery & Grill
 Cleveland Brewing Company
 Clipper City Brewing Company
 Coast Brewing Company
 Coast Range Brewing Company
 Coeur D'Alene Brewing Company
 Colorado Belle
 Colorado Boy Brewing Company
 Colorado Brewery & Trading Company
 Colorado Brewing Company/Draft House
 Columbus Brewing Company
 Columbia River Brewing Company
 The Commons Brewery CLOSED
 Community Beer Company
 Commonwealth Brewing Company
 CooperSmith's Pub and Brewing Company
 Coors Archive Brewery
 Coors Brewing Company
 Copper Kettle Brewing Company
 Copper Tank Brewing Company CLOSED
 Cottonwood Brewery
 Cowboy Restaurant & The Brewery
 Covey Restaurant & Brewery
 Coyote Springs Brewing Company
 Crabtree Brewing Company
 Craftsman Brewing Company
 Crested Butte Brewery
 Crooked River Brewing Company
 Crooked Stave Artisan Beer Project
 Custom Brewcrafters Inc.

D
 Dakota Brewing Company
 Dale Bros. Brewery
 Dark Horse Brewing Company
 DC Brau Brewing Company
 Del Norte Brewing Company CLOSED
 Delafield Brewhaus
 Dells Brewing Company
 Dempsey's Ales House/Sonoma Brewing
 Denver Beer Company
 Deschutes Brewery
 Desert Edge Brewery
 DESTIHL
 The Detroit Beer Company
 Devil Mountain Brewery
 Devils Backbone Brewing Company -Basecamp
 Devils Backbone Brewing Company -Outpost
 DG Yuengling & Sons Inc.
 Diamond Bear Brewing Company
 Dillon DAM Brewery
 Dilworth Micro Brewery
 Dixie Brewing Company
 Dock Street Brewery
 DOG Brewing Company
 Dogfish Head Craft Brewery
 Dogwood Brewing Company
 Dornbusch Brewing Company
 Dostal Alley Brewpub & Casino
 Drake's Brewing Company
 Dry Dock Brewing Company
 The Duck-Rabbit Craft Brewery Inc.
 DuClaw Brewing Company
 Durango Brewing Company

E
 Echo Brewing Company
 Eddyline Brewing
 Eel River Brewing Company
 EJ Phair Brewing Company
 El Toro Brewing Company
 Elevator Brewing Company
 Elk Grove Brewery and Restaurant CLOSED
 Elliott Bay Brewery Pub
 Elysian Brewing Company
 Emmett's Tavern & Brewing Company
 Empire Brewing Company
 Engine House #9 Restaurant & Brewery
 Epic Brewing Company
 Equinox Brewing Company
 Erie Brewing Company
 Eske's Brew Pub & Eatery
 Eskes Park Brewery
 Etna Brewing Company
 Eugene City Brewery CLOSED
 Evansville Brewing Company

F
 Falstaff Brewing Company
 Far West Brewing Company
 Fat Head's Brewery
 Fat Head's Brewery & Saloon
 Fegley's Allentown & Bethlehem Brew Works
 Fegley's Brew Works
 FiftyFifty Brewing Company
 Figueroa Mountain Brewing Company
 Firehouse Grill & Brewery
 Firestone Walker Brewing Company
 Fish Brewing Company
 Fitger's Brewhouse
 Fitzpatrick's
 Flat Branch Pub and Brewery
 Florida Beer Company
 Flossmoor Station Brewing Company
 Flyers Restaurant and Brewery
 Flying Aces Brewing Company
 Flying Dog Brewery
 Flying Fish Brewing Company
 Foothills Brewing
 Former Future Brewing Company
 Fort Collins Brewery
 Fort Hill Brewhouse
 Founders Brewing Company
 Four Peaks Brewing Company
 Fox River Brewing Company Fratellos
 Frankenmuth Brewery Inc.
 Frederick Brewing Company
 Fredericksburg Brewing Company
 Free State Brewing Company
 Fremont Brewing
 Friends Brewing Company
 Full Pint Brewing Company
 Full Sail Brewing Company
 Full Sail Brewing Company Riverplace
 Funkwerks

G
 G. Heileman Brewing Company
 Gella's Diner and Lb. Brewing Company
 General Lafayette Inn & Brewery
 Ghost River Brewing
 Gilbert Robinson Inc.
 Gilded Otter Brewing Company
 Glacier Brewhouse
 Glassock Brewing Company
 Glenwood Canyon Brewing Company
 Gluek Brewing Company/ Reflo Inc
 Golden City Brewery
 Golden Pacific Brewing Company CLOSED
 Goose Island Beer Company
 Gordon Biersch Brewing Company
 Gordon Biersch Brewery Restaurant TN
 Gordon Biersch Brewery Restaurant Group CO
 Grand Teton Brewing Company
 Gray Brewing Company
 Great Adirondack Brewing Company
 Great American Restaurants
 Great Basin Brewing Company
 Great Dane Pub & Brewing
 Great Divide Brewing Company
 Great Heights Brewing Company
 Great Lakes Brewing Company Ohio
 Green Flash Brewing Company
 Grimm Brothers Brewhouse
 Grumpy Troll Brewery, Restaurant & Pizzeria
 Gunnison Brewery
 Gunwhale Ales

H
 Hale's Ales Brewery & Pub
 Half Acre Beer Company
 Ham's Restaurant & Brewhouse
 Harmon Restaurant & Brewery
 Harpoon Brewery
 Hart Brewing Inc.
 Harvester Brewing
 Havenhill Brewery
 Haymaker Pub & Brewery
 HC Berger Brewing
 Heartland Brewing Company
 Heavenly Daze Brewery & Grill
 Heileman Brewing Company
 Henry Weinhart's Brewing
 Heretic Brewing Company
 Hereford & Hops Brewpub
 Heritage Brewing Company
 Herkimer Pub and Brewery
 Hibernia Brewing Company
 High Falls Brewing Company
 High Noon Saloon & Brewery
 High Point Brewing Corp
 High Sierra Brewing Company
 Highland Brewing Company
 Hoffbrau Steaks Brewery
 HofbrauHaus Brewery & Biergarten at Station Casino
 Hollister Brewing Company
 Holy City Brewing
 Holy Cow!
 Honolulu Brewing Company
 Hood Canal Brewing Company
 Hook & Ladder Brewing Company
 Hope Brewing Company
 Hoppin' Frog Brewing Company
 Hoppers Brooker Creek Grille & Tap Room
 Hoppers Grill & Brewing Company
 Hoppy Brewing Company
 Hops Bistro and Brewery
 Hops Grillhouse and Brewery
 Hoptown Brewing Company
 Hopworks Urban Brewery
 Houston Brewery CLOSED
 Hub City Brewery
 Hubcap Brewery & Kitchen Dallas
 Hudepohl-Schoenling Brewing Company
 Humboldt Brewery
 Humperdinks Restaurant and Brewery
 Huntington Beach Beer Company

I
 Idaho Brewing Company
 Idle Spur
 Il Vicino Brewing Company
 Independence Brewing Company Philadelphia PA CLOSED
 Irish Times Pub & Brewery
 Iron Hill Brewery & Restaurant Newark
 Iron Hill Brewery & Restaurant - Lancaster
 Iron Hill Brewery & Restaurant - Media
 Iron Hill Brewery & Restaurant - Phoenixville
 Iron Hill Brewery & Restaurant - Wilmington
 Iron Hill Brewery & Restaurant West Chester
 Iron Springs Pub & Brewery
 Ironworks Pub
 Island Brewing Company
 Issaquah Brewhouse Rogue Ales
 Ithaca Beer Company

J
 Jack's Abby Brewing
 Jacob Leinenkugel Brewing Company
 James Page Brewing Company
 Jarre Creek Ranch Brewery
 Jaxon's Restaurant & Brewery
 JE Siebel & Sons Company Inc.
 JJ Bitting Brewing Company
 JT Whitneys Pub & Brewery
 John Harvard's Brew House
 Jolly Pumpkin Artisan Ales
 Jones Brewing Company
 Jos Schlitz Brewing Company
 Joseph Huber Brewing Company
 Jump Cafe
 Jupiter Brewpub
 Jurupa Valley Brewing Company

K
 Kalamazoo Brewing
 Kannah Creek Brewing Company
 Kansas City Bier Company
 Karl Strauss Brewing Company
 Kelmers Brewhouse
 Kern River Brewing
 Kessler Brewing Company
 Kettlehouse Brewing Company
 Kidders Brewpub
 Kohola Brewery
 Kona Brewing Company
 Kuhnhenn Brewing Company

L
 La Cumbre Brewing Company
 La Conner Brewing Company
 Lake Tahoe Brewing Company CLOSED
 Lakefront Brewery
 Latrobe Brewing Company
 Laughing Dog Brewing
 Laurelwood Brewing Company
 Lawrenceville Brewing Company
 Leavenworth Brewery
 Left Coast Brewery and Cafe
 Left Hand Brewing Company
 Leinenkugel's Ballyard Brewery
 Lexington Avenue Brewery
 Liberty Street Brewing Company
 Lind Brewing Company
 Lindens Brewing Company
 The Lion Brewery
 Little Apple Brewing Company
 Local Color Brewing Company
 Logsdon Farmville Ales
 Lone Star Brewing Company
 Lonerider Brewing Company
 Lonetree Brewing Ltd
 Long Trail Brewing Company
 Long Valley Pub and Brewery
 Los Gatos Brewing Company CLOSED
 The Lost Abbey
 Lost Coast Brewery and Cafe
 Louisiana Jack's
 Lumberyard Brewing Company

M
 MacTarnahan's Brewing Company CLOSED
 Mad Anthony Brewing Company
 Mad Fox Brewing Company
 Mad River Brewing Company
 Magnolia Gastropub and Brewery
 Main Street Brewery
 Mammoth Brewing
 Marble Brewery
 Marin Brewing Company
 Martha's Exchange
 Mash House Restaurant & Brewing Company
 Maui Brewing Company
 Maui Brewing Company Brewpub
 Max Lager's Wood-Fired Grill & Brewery
 McCoy's Public House and Brewkitchen
 Mcguire's Irish Pub
 McKenzie Brew House
 McKenzie River Partners
 McNeil's Brewery
 Mendocino Brewing Company
 Michelob Brewing Company
 Michigan Brewing Company
 Mickey Finn's Brewery
 Mickey's Brewing Company
 Midnight Sun Brewing Company
 Mile High Brewing Company
 Mill Brewery, Eatery & Bakery
 Miller Brewing Company
 Millstream Brewing Company
 Minneapolis Town Hall Brewery
 Minnesota Brewing
 Minocqua Brewing Company
 Mishawaka Brewing Company
 Mission Brewery
 Montana Brewing Company
 Montgomery Brewing Company
 Moon River Brewing Company
 Moose's Tooth Brewing Company
 Moosejaw Pizza and Brewing
 Morgan Street Brewery
 Mother Earth Brewing Company
 Mountain Sun Pub and Brewery
 Mountain Valley Brew Pub
 Moylan's Brewing Company

N
 Napa Smith Brewery
 Napa Valley Brewing Company
 Nashville Brewing Company
 Native Brewing Company
 Natty Greene's Brewing Company
 Nebraska Brewing Company
 Nectar Ales
 Neshaminy Creek Brewing Company
 Neuweiler Brewing Company Inc.
 New Belgium Brewing Company
 New England Brewing Company
 New Glarus Brewing Company
 New Holland Brewing Company
 New Mexico Brewers Guild
 New Planet Beer Company
 New River Brewing Company
 New Road Brew House
 New South Brewing
 Newport Beach Brewing Company
 Ninkasi Brewing Company
 NoDa Brewing Company
 Nodding Head Brewing Company
 No-Li Brewhouse
 North by Northwest
 North Coast Brewing Company Inc.
 North East Brewing Company Inc.
 The Northampton Brewery
 Northwoods Brewing Corporation

O
 O'Fallon Brewery
 O'Ryans Tavern and Brewery
 Oak Creek Brewing Company
 Oaken Barrel Brewing Company
 Oakshire Brewing
 Oasis Brewery
 Oasis Brewery Annex
 Oasis Brewery and Restaurant
 Odell Brewing Company
 Offshore Ale Company
 Oggi's Pizza Brewing Company
 Old Dominion Brewing Company
 Old Marlborough Brewing Company
 Old New York Brewing Company
 The Olde Mecklenburg Brewery
 Olde Peninsula Brewpub & Restaurant
 Olde Saratoga Brewing Company
 Oldenberg Brewery/Drawbridge
 Oliver Breweries Ltd
 On Tap Bistro & Brewery
 Opa-Opa Brewing Company
 Oregon Ale and Beer Company CLOSED
 Oregon Trail Brewery
 Oskar Blues Brewery
 Otter Creek Brewing/Wolaver's Organic Ales
 Otto Brothers Brewing Company
 Outer Banks Brewing Company
 Overland Stage Stop Brewery
 The Oyster Bar Bistro & Brewery

P
 Pabst Brewing Company
 Pacific Beach Brewhouse
 Pacific Brewing
 Pacific Coast Brewing Company CLOSED
 Pagosa Brewing Company
 Papago Brewing Company CLOSED
 Park Slope Brewing Company
 Pearl Brewing Company
 Pelican Pub & Brewery
 Pennsylvania Brewing Company
 Perennial Artisan Ales
 Pete's Brewing Company
 Pete's Place
Peticolas Brewing Company
 PH Woods Restaurant & Brewery
 Phantom Canyon Brewing
 Piece Brewery
 Pig's Eye Brewing Company
 Pike Brewing Company
 Pittsburgh Brewing Company
 Pizza Port Carlsbad
 Pizza Port Ocean Beach
 Pizza Port San Clemente
 Pizza Port Solona Beach
 Plank Road Brewery
 Pony Express Brewing Company
 Port Brewing Company
 Port Brewing & The Lost Abbey
 Portland Brewing Company
 Portsmouth Brewery
 Port City Brewing Company
 Powerhouse Restaurant & Brewery
 Prescott Brewing Company
 The Prodigal Brewery
 The Public House Brewing
 Pug Ryan's Brewery
 Pump House Brewery
 Pyramid Breweries Inc

Q
 Quincy Ships Brewing Company

R
 Rahr & Sons Brewing
 Rainer Brewing Company Inc.
 Ram Production Brewery
 RAM Restaurant and Brewery Boise
 RAM Restaurant and Brewery - Indianapolis
 RAM Restaurant and Brewery - Salem
 RAM Restaurant and Brewery - Seattle
 RAM Restaurant and Brewery - Wheeling
 Real Ale Brewing Company
 Red Ass Brewing Company
 Red Brick-Atlanta Brewing Company
 Red Lodge Ales Brewing Company
 Red Star Brewery & Grille
 Redfish New Orleans Brewhouse
 Redhook Brewery - Woodinville
 Redrock Brewing Company
 Redwood Brewing Company
 Redwood Coast Brewing Company
 Revolution Brewing
 Rhino Chasers
 Rhomberg Brewing Company
 Right Brain Brewery
 Rikenjaks Brewing Company
 Rio Salado Brewing Company
 River Market Brewing Company
 Riverside Brewing Company
 RJ Rockers Brewing Company
 Rochester Mills Beer Company
 Rock Bottom Brewery Arlington
 Rock Bottom Brewery Bellevue
 Rock Bottom Brewery Bethesda
 Rock Bottom Brewery Campbell
 Rock Bottom Brewery Chicago
 Rock Bottom Brewery Denver
 Rock Bottom Brewery Des Moines
 Rock Bottom Brewery Desert Ridge
 Rock Bottom Brewery King of Prussia
 Rock Bottom Brewery La Jolla
 Rock Bottom Brewery Long Beach
 Rock Bottom Brewery Milwaukee
 Rock Bottom Brewery Orland Park
 Rock Bottom Scottsdale    CLOSED
 Rock Bottom Brewery Westminster
 Rockies Brewing Company
 Rocky River Brewing Company OH
 Rocky River Brewing Company TN
 Rockyard Brewing Company
 Rogue Ales
 Rohrbach Brewing Company
 Royal Oak Brewery
 Rubicon Brewing Company CLOSED
 Ruby Mountain Brewing Company
 Russian River Brewing Company

S
 Sacramento Brewing Company CLOSED
 Saint Arnold Brewing Company
 Salem Beer Works
 Salt Lake Brewing Company
 San Andreas Brewing Company
 San Diego Brewing Company
 San Tan Brewing Company
 The SandLot
 Santa Barbara Brewing Company CLOSED
 Santa Fe Brewing Company
 Saranac FX Matt Brewing Company
 Sarasota Brewing Company
 Saxer Brewing Company
 Schaefer Brewing Company
 Schlitz Brewing Company
 Shmaltz Brewing Company
 Schooner Brewery Net Gamelink
 Schooner's Grille & Brewery CLOSED
 Sea Dog Brewing Company
 Seabright Brewery
 Seagram Beverages
 Second Street Brewery
 Sharky's Brewery & Grill
Shoe Tree Brewing Company
 Short's Brewing Company
 Sierra Blanca Brewing Company
 Sierra Nevada Brewing Company
 Silver City Brewery
 Silver Moon Brewing
 Sioux Falls Brewing Company
 Six Point Craft Ales
 Six Rivers Brewery
 Ska Brewing Company
 Sleeping Giant Brewing Company
 Sleeping Lady Brewing Company/ Snow Goose Restaurant
 Slesar Brothers Brewing Company
 SLO Brewing Company
 SLO Brewing Company Paso Robles
 SLO Brewing Company San Luis Obispo
 Sly Fox Brewing Company
 Smiling Moose Brewpub & Grill
 Smoky Mountain Brewery
 Smuggler's Brewpub
 Smylie Brothers Brewing Company
 Smuttynose Brewing Company
 Snake River Brewing
 Snake River Brewing Lander
 Snipes Mountain Brewing Company
 Snow Goose Restaurant
 Sonoma Brewing Company
 Sophisticated Otter Brewing Company
 Southampton Publick House
 Southend Brewery
 Southern Oregon and Pacific
 Spanish Peaks Brewing Company
 Spanish Springs Brewing
 Spoetzl Brewery
 Sports City Cafe & Brewery
 Sprecher Brewing Company
 Springfield Brewing Company
 Squatters Pub Brewery
 St. Ides Brewing Company
 Stanislaus Area Association
 Stark Mill Brewery
 Starr Hill Brewery
 Steamworks Brewing Company
 Steelhead Brewery Company
 Stevens Point Brewery
 Stewart's Brewing Company
 Stoddard's Brewhouse & Eatery
 Stone Brewing Company
 Stoudt's Brewing Company
 Strange Brewing Company
 Stroh Brewery Company
 Stuft Pizza & Brewing Company
 Sudwerk Privatbrauerei Hubsch
 Sullivan's Black Forest Brew Haus & Grill
 Summit Brewing Company
 Sun King Brewery Company
 Sun Valley Brewing Company
 Surly Brewing Company
 SweetWater Brewing Company
 Sweetwater Tavern & Brewery

T
 T-Bonz Homegrown Ales
 Tabernash Brewing Company
 Tap It Brewing Company
 Tap & Growler
 TAPS Fish House & Brewery
 Telegraph Brewing Company
 Telluride Brewing Company
 Tenaya Creek Brewery
 Tequesta Brewing Company
 Terrapin Beer Company
 Thai Me Up Brewing
 Third Street Aleworks
 Thirsty Dog Brewing Company
 Thomas Creek Brewery
 Thomas Kemper Brewery
 Thousand Oaks Brewing Company CLOSED
 Three Brothers Brewing Company
 Three Floyds Brewing
 Three Needs Brewery
 Thunder Canyon Brewery
 Tied House Cafe & Brewery
 Titanic Brewing Company
 Titletown Brewing Company
 Tommyknocker Brewery
 Trap Rock Restaurant and Brewery
 Tri-City Brewing Company
 Trinity Brewing Company
 Triple Rock Brewery and Alehouse
 Triumph Brewing Company New Hope
 Triumph Brewing Company of Philadelphia
 Triumph Brewing Company Princeton
 Tröegs Brewing Company
 Trout Brook Brewing Company
 Trumer Brauerei Berkeley
 Twenty Tank Brewery CLOSED
 Twisted Pine Brewing Company
 Tustin Brewing Company
 Two Rows Restaurant & Brewery
 Two Brothers Brewing Company
 Typhoon Brewery

U
 Uinta Brewing Company
 Uncle Billy's Brew & Que
 Uncle Billy's Brew & Que - Lake Travis
 Union Craft Brewing Company
 Union Colony Brewery
 Unique Beers
 Upland Brewing Company
 Upslope Brewing Company
 Upstream Brewing Company
 USA Cafe
 Utah Brewers Co-op

V
 Val Blatz Brewery
 Valhalla Microbrewery & Restaurant
 Valley Brewing Company
 Valley Forge Brewing Company
 Vermont Pub and Brewery
 Victory Brewing Company
 Vienna Brewing Company
 Village Brewery
 Vino's Pizza*Pub*Brewery
 Vintage Brewing Company
 Virginia Beverage Company CLOSED
 Virginia Brewing Company (AL) CLOSED
 Vulcan Brewing Company CLOSED

W
 Wagner Brewing Company
 Wagner Valley Brewing Company
 Walking Man Brewing
 Walnut Brewery
 Wasatch Brew Pub
 Water Street Brewery
 Waterloo Brewing Company CLOSED
 Watson Brothers Brewhouse
 Weasel Boy Brewing Company
 Weeping Radish Farm & Brewery
 Weinkeller Brewery
 West Bros Brewery
 Western Reserve Brewing
 Westwood Brewing Company
 Weyerbacher Brewing Company
 Widmer Brothers Brewing Company
 Wild Boar Brewing Company CLOSED
 Wild Duck Brewery & Restaurant
 Wild River Brewing
 The Willoughby Brewing Company
 Wilmington Brewing Company
 William S Newman Brewing Company
 Wind River Brewing Company
 Wolf Canyon Brewing Company
 Wolf Pack Brewing Company
 Wolf Tongue Brewery
 Wynkoop Brewing Company

Y
 Yak and Yeti Brewpub
 Yakima Brewing CLOSED
 Yards Brewing Company
 Yazoo Brewing Company
 Ybor City Brewing Company CLOSED
 Yegua Creek Brewing Company
 Yellowstone Valley Brewing Company

Z
 Zele International

See also

 Beer and breweries by region
 Brewery
 Pub
 Regional brewery

References

Beer in the United States
Great American Beer Festival
Colorado-related lists
Beer Festival Medalists